K. Sabeel Rahman is an American legal scholar, author, and policy advisor who currently serves as Senior Counselor in the Office of Information and Regulatory Affairs (OIRA) in the Biden administration. He joined the Biden Administration from Demos, a liberal think tank he served as president of from 2018 to 2021.

Education 
Rahman studied at Harvard University, where he received his bachelor's degree (B.A.), Juris Doctor (J.D.), and Ph.D degree in political theory. Additionally, he attended Pembroke College, Oxford as a Rhodes Scholar, where he studied both law and economic development.

Career 
During his career, he has held fellowships at both New America and the Roosevelt Institute, and notably served as co-chair of the Law and Political Economy (LPE) Project. Rahman once served as an analyst within OIRA during the Obama Administration, and would return to the office as a Senior Counselor under President Joe Biden. In New York City, he served as a special advisor for economic development from 2014 to 2015 and has also served on the city's Rent Guidelines Board.

Rahman served as an associate professor of law at Brooklyn Law School from 2015 to 2019, and is currently on leave from the institution. The bulk of Rahman's work has focused on regulatory and administrative law, taking a neorepublican perspective on power and participatory democracy inspired by the work of John Dewey and Louis Brandeis.

Bibliography
Rahman, K. Sabeel. (2016). Democracy Against Domination. Oxford University Press. 
Rahman, K. Sabeel and Russon Gillman, Holly. (2019). Civic Power: Rebuilding American Democracy in an Era of Crisis. Cambridge University Press. 
Michael Hardt, Bonnie Honig, Elaine Kamarck, K. Sabeel Rahman, Tracey Meares, Marshall Steinbaum. (2019). The President's House Is Empty: Losing and Gaining Public Goods. MIT Press.

References

External links
K. Sabeel Rahman Homepage

1983 births
American people of Bangladeshi descent
American Rhodes Scholars
Biden administration personnel
Harvard Law School alumni
Living people